Walter Birbaum was a Swiss footballer who played for Nordstern Basel, FC Basel and Concordia Basel. He played as goalkeeper.

In the year 1919 Birbaum moved from Nordstern Basel to FC Basel. His first game for his new club was on 21 December 1919 as Basel won 3–2 against Aarau. During the club's 1919–20 season Birbaum played just three Swiss Serie A games for Basel before he moved on again to Concordia Basel for the 1920–21 season.

References

Sources
 Rotblau: Jahrbuch Saison 2017/2018. Publisher: FC Basel Marketing AG. 
 Die ersten 125 Jahre. Publisher: Josef Zindel im Friedrich Reinhardt Verlag, Basel. 
 Verein "Basler Fussballarchiv" Homepage

FC Basel players
Swiss men's footballers
Association football goalkeepers